Jackson Township is one of twelve townships in Boone County, Indiana. As of the 2010 census, its population was 2,731 and it contained 1,089 housing units.

Geography

Cities and towns
 Advance
 Jamestown (vast majority)

Unincorporated towns
 Ward

Adjacent townships
 Center (northeast)
 Harrison (east)
 Jefferson (north)
 Clark Township, Montgomery County (southwest)
 Eel River Township, Hendricks County (south)
 Union Township, Hendricks County (southeast)
 Walnut Township, Montgomery County (west)

Major highways
  Interstate 74
  U.S. Route 136
  Indiana State Road 75
  Indiana State Road 234

Cemeteries
The township contains five cemeteries: Brown, Independent Order of Odd Fellows, Lowry, Porter and Union.

References
 
 United States Census Bureau cartographic boundary files

External links

 Indiana Township Association
 United Township Association of Indiana

Townships in Boone County, Indiana
Townships in Indiana